Dum Dum Kishore Bharati High School is a boys' school in Dum Dum. This school is affiliated to the West Bengal Board of Secondary Education for 10th Board exam (Madhyamik Pariksha/Secondary Examination) and West Bengal Council of Higher Secondary Education for the 12th Board exam (Uchcha Madhyamik/Higher Secondary Examination). Dum Dum Kishore Bharati School was established by Mihir Sengupta on 16 January 1965. It is considered as the best school in Dum Dum area, having a significantly good result in the board exams. This school also holds rank in H.S. exam. This school is eminent for their unique humanitarian and nature-conserving ceremonies such as blood donation camps, tree plantation programme, trekking, etc. Teachers of this school are enough caring and called 'dada' or 'didi'  as they are like real brothers or sisters.

References

External links 

Boys' schools in India
High schools and secondary schools in Kolkata
Educational institutions established in 1965
1965 establishments in West Bengal